Cicuco is a town and municipality located in the Bolívar Department, northern Colombia.

References

Municipalities of Bolívar Department